Chagda is the name of several rural localities in the Sakha Republic, Russia:
Chagda, Aldansky District, Sakha Republic, a selo in Chagdinsky Rural Okrug of Aldansky District
Chagda, Kobyaysky District, Sakha Republic, a selo in Nizhilinsky Rural Okrug of Kobyaysky District